The 16th Legislative Assembly of Quebec was the provincial legislature in Quebec, Canada that existed from February 5, 1923, to May 16, 1927. The Quebec Liberal Party led by Louis-Alexandre Taschereau was the governing party.

Seats per political party

 After the 1923 elections

Member list

This was the list of members of the Legislative Assembly of Quebec that were elected in the 1923 election:

Other elected MLAs

Other MLAs were elected during the term in by-elections

 Hector Authier, Quebec Liberal Party, Abitibi, October 22, 1923 
 Carlton James Oliver, Quebec Liberal Party, Brome, October 22, 1923 
 Stanislas-Edmond Desmarais, Quebec Liberal Party, Richmond, October 22, 1923 
 David Laperrière, Quebec Liberal Party, Yamaska, October 22, 1923 
 Pierre-Émile Côté, Quebec Liberal Party, Bonaventure, November 5, 1924 
 Ludger Bastien, Quebec Conservative Party, Québec, November 5, 1924 
 Alphonse-Edgar Guillemette, Quebec Liberal Party, Saint-Maurice, November 5, 1924 
 Armand-Charles Crépeau, Quebec Conservative Party, Sherbrooke, November 5, 1924 
 Joseph Miljours, Quebec Liberal Party, Témiscamingue, November 28, 1924 
 Joseph-Léon Saint-Jacques, Quebec Conservative Party, Argenteuil, November 30, 1925 
 Amédée Sylvestre, Quebec Liberal Party, Berthier, November 30, 1925 
 William-Pierre Grant, Quebec Liberal Party, Champlain, November 30, 1925 
 Victor Marchand, Quebec Liberal Party, Jacques-Cartier, November 30, 1925

Cabinet Ministers

 Prime Minister and Executive Council President: Louis-Alexandre Taschereau
 Agriculture: Joseph-Édouard Caron
 Colonisation, Mines and Fishing: Joseph-Édouard Perrault 
 Public Works and Labor: Antonin Galipeault 
 Lands and Forests: Honoré Mercier Jr 
 Roads: Joseph-Léonide Perron
 Municipal Affairs: Jacob Nicol (1923-1924), Louis-Alexandre Taschereau (1924-1927)
 Attorney General: Louis-Alexandre Taschereau 
 Provincial secretary: Athanase David 
 Treasurer: Jacob Nicol
 Members without portfolios: Martin Madden, Laureat Lapierre (1924-1927), Joseph Henry Dillon (1927), Alfred Leduc (1927)

References
 1923 election results
 List of Historical Cabinet Ministers

16